The Duwamish are a Lushootseed-speaking Native American tribe in western Washington, and the indigenous people of metropolitan Seattle, where they have been living since the end of the last glacial period (c. 8000 BCE, 10,000 years ago). The Duwamish Tribe descends from at least two distinct groups from before intense contact with people of European ancestry—the People of the Inside (the environs of Elliott Bay) and the People of the Large Lake (Lake Washington)—and continues to evolve both culturally and ethnically. By historic language, the Duwamish are (Skagit-Nisqually) Lushootseed; Lushootseed is a Salishan language. Adjacent tribes throughout the Puget Sound-Strait of Georgia basin were, and are, interconnected and interrelated, yet distinct. Today, some Duwamish people are enrolled in the federally recognized Tulalip Tribes of Washington as well as the Muckleshoot Tribe.

The present-day Duwamish Tribe developed in parallel with the times of the Treaty of Point Elliott and its aftermath in the 1850s. Although not recognized by the U.S. federal government, the Duwamish remain an organized Tribe with roughly 500 enrolled members as of 2004. In 2009, the Duwamish Tribe opened the Duwamish Longhouse and Cultural Center on purchased land near their ancient settlement of Ha-AH-Poos (also written hah-AH-poos) in West Seattle, near the mouth of the Duwamish River.

History

Before white settlement 

What is now Seattle has been inhabited since the end of the last glacial period (c. 8000 BC—10,000 years ago). Sites at West Point in Discovery Park (in Seattle's Magnolia district) date back at least 4,000 years. Villages at the then-mouth of the Duwamish River in what is now the Industrial District had been inhabited since the 6th century AD.

Thirteen prominent villages were in what is now the City of Seattle. The people living around Elliott Bay, the Duwamish, Black and Cedar Rivers were collectively known as the doo-AHBSH, "People of the Inside" (see below for more detailed discussion of this name). There were four prominent villages on Elliott Bay and the then-estuarial lower Duwamish River .  Before civil engineering, the area had extensive tidelands, abundantly rich in marine life which was eaten as seafood.

The people living around Lake Washington were collectively known as the hah-choo-AHBSH, "People of the Large Lake" (see below for more detailed discussion of this name). Another group strong culturally associated with the "People of the Large Lake" are the Ha-achu-abshs / Ha-achu-AHBSH ("People of the Small Lake / People of the Little Lake") living around Lake Union. At the time of initial major European contact, these people considered themselves distinct from the related People of the Inside, with whom they are joined in today's Duwamish Tribe. Prior to the construction of the Lake Washington Ship Canal in the 1910s, Lake Washington drained into the Black River in what is now Renton. The Black River joined the Cedar and White (now Green) rivers to become the Duwamish River and empty into southeast Elliott Bay.  With ever-increasing European contact, the People of the Large Lake and the People of the Inside became unified under the rubric of the Duwamish Tribe.

Seasons 
There were numerous villages in what would become the Seattle metropolitan area as well as the nearby Snoqualmie River valley.  Common to Coast Salish, villages were diffuse: people dispersed in the spring, congregated for the salmon in the summer, and wintered in village longhouses.

In spring, salmonberry shoots and bracken fern fiddleheads were foraged, while hunters searched for deer or elk grazing on the skunk cabbage or the anthropogenic grasslands.  Camas from nearby prairies would be gathered or traded.  The grasslands encouraged berries, fern roots, bulbs and other useful plants.  Garry oaks, whose thick bark helps them survive fires, are typically associated with prairies, and their presence at Seward Park and Martha Washington Parks suggests that anthropogenic grasslands extended between them.  They may have been planted for their edible acorns.

In summer and fall, thimbleberries, salal, raspberries, salmonberries, trailing blackberries, serviceberries, strawberries, huckleberries, and others were foraged.  The berries were eaten fresh, or dried and formed into cakes to preserve them for winter.  Mixed with dried fish and oil in recipes, pemmican made hearty late winter fare or compact, hardy provision for travel.  Women and children would gather important wetland plants such as cattails for mats and wapato ("Indian potatoes") for food.  Crayfish and freshwater mussels were available in the lake.

Shellfish and tidal resources were available year round, limited only by red tide or similar infrequent closures.  From midsummer through November, life revolved around the iconic salmon s√ʔuládxʷ and realization of its inspiring power and wealth, both corporeal and spiritual.  Salmon returned to virtually every stream with enough flow; among these streams was sqa’ts1d ("blocked mouth"), now called Genesee Creek, which formerly drained the Rainier Valley.  The name of the creek suggests that a fishing weir in place blocked the mouth of the stream during part of the spawning season.  Such weirs were made from the willows that occur abundantly along the lake shore.  Fish were dried on racks to preserve them for the winter months.

During the long wet winter and early spring, the diet of dried fish and berries was supplemented by hunting ducks, beaver, muskrat, raccoon, otter, and bear.  Winters were for construction and repair, for the arts, socializing and ceremonies, and for stories in a rich oral tradition.

Life was, however, not quite idyllic.  Northern Coast Salish and Wakashan from harder climates to the north were wont to raid. Food resources varied, and resources were not always sufficient to last through to spring.  There is evidence that an extensive trade and potlatch network evolved to help distribute resources to areas in need that varied year to year, and was potent and effective until European diseases arriving in the 1770s and ravaged the region for more than a century.

Society 

There is very little information prior to the 1850s about the ancestors of today's Duwamish people, for a mix of reasons. The anthropological societal descriptions provide snapshots of the structures in the second quarter of the 19th century and a little later.  European contact and changes began accelerating greatly from 1833.

Each village had one or more cedar plank longhouses (khwaac'ál'al or syúdəbàl?txʷ) containing extended families in a social structures that foreshadowed the cohousing of today.  Tens of people lived in each one. There are several reasonable approximations to longhouses in Seattle today. The entry and beam architecture of restaurateur Ivar Haglund's Salmon House Restaurant (1969) beside Lake Union in Northlake is as authentically accurate as building codes allowed.  Another example is the north face of the Burke Museum at the University of Washington. More recently, the design of the main hall of the Duwamish Longhouse and Cultural Center (opened 2009) closely echoes a traditional longhouse.

Villages were usually located facing a beach and body of water or river navigable by canoe, near a creek and drinking water source.  Beyond the diffuse villages and anthropogenic grasslands, most land was heavily forested. Understory tended to be dense along the edges; travel by canoe was generally far more practical than by land.  The nearby creek (dᶻəlíxʷ) would often be called Little Water(stútələkʷ), an endearing familiar.

The People of the Inside and the People of the Large Lake, like other Salish, were more a collection of villages linked by language and family ties than a nation or state.  Relationships and stature among family and community were important measures or goals in life.

The People of the Inside, the People of the Large Lake, the People of the Small Lake, the People of Lake Sammamish and to a little lesser extent, the People of the Snoqualmie (which called themselves S·dukwalbixw /Sduqwalbixw) were all closely interrelated in a daisy chain following the geography. The "People of the clear salt water" or Suquamish (Suqwabš) were also related. Of these, the first two, today's Duwamish, were a relatively dense population on prime real estate, and were the most immediately dispossessed at the time of European settlement.

Trading relationships and privileges were extensive between peoples of the entire Pacific Northwest (or "Cascadia"), including over the passes to what is now Eastern Washington.  Relationships and trade were often cemented with the world-wide practice of intermarriage.  Villages were linked to others through intermarriage, which also carried status and trading privileges; the wife usually went to live at the husband's village.  While each extended family village might have their own customs, there were strong commonalities, particularly in language but also including philosophical beliefs, economic conditions, and ceremonial practices.

The central and southern part of Puget Sound was the primary waterway connecting the greater Lushootseed (Skagit-Nisqually) Coast Salish Nations.  Environmental resources were so abundant that the Skagit-Nisqually Salish had one of the world's few sedentary hunter-gatherer societies.  Life before the arrival of Europeans revolved around a social organization based on house groupings within a village, and reciprocal hospitality within and between villages.

Society was divided into upper class, lower class, and slaves, all largely hereditary.  Nobility was based on impeccable genealogy, intertribal kinship, wise use of resources, and possession of esoteric knowledge about the workings of spirits and the spirit world, making an effective marriage of class, secular, religious, and economic power.  Like some other Native American groups, the People of the Inside and the People of the Large Lake made their free-born look different: mothers carefully shaped the heads of their young babies, binding them with cradle boards just long enough to produce a steep sloping forehead. Traditionally, there was no recognized permanent political leadership, which confused and frustrated people of European ancestry when they began to trade and settle in the area. There was little political organization that was understood by Europeans.  The highest-ranking appropriate male would assume the role of ceremonial leader for some timely purpose, but rank could be variable and was determined by different standards.

Contact and rapid change 

From the 1800s, the maritime fur trade in the Puget Sound-Strait of Georgia accelerated the pace of social and organizational change.  White settlements at sbuh-KWAH-buks (Alki) and what is now Pioneer Square in Downtown Seattle were established in 1851 and 1852.

By the time Coast Salish began to realize the implications of the changes brought by Europeans at ever-increasing rates, the time was late.  After just five years, lands were occupied; the Treaty of Point Elliott was signed in 1855.  There is question about its legitimacy, from the lack of understanding of the two sides about each other to the motivations of the U.S. government and its agents. Whites recognized leaders more or less at their own choosing, bypassing what they saw as the maddening fluidity of tribal leadership. The potlatch was widely banned, and the longhouse soon suppressed.

Prominent contact-era Duwamish people 
The role of the most famous of the Duwamish, Chief Seattle (b. c. 1784, d. 1866; see below for more detailed discussion of his name), is complex and enigmatic.  Chief Seattle's mother Sholeetsa was of the People of the Inside and his father Shweabe was si'ab ("high status man") of the Suquamish.  Chief Seattle's career earned and validated his inherited status.  As an adult he was among the leaders of his people from the times they were the People of the Inside and the People of the Large Lake to becoming known as the Duwamish Tribe. Chief Seattle had two wives and seven children, probably the most famous being his daughter, known as Princess Angeline.  Some of the family tree of Chief Seattle is known today.

Besides Chief Seattle and his descendants, Lake John Cheshiahud and his family are among the few late-19th century Duwamish individuals about whom anything specific is known. He is found in archives as Cheshiahud, Cheslahud, Lake John Cheshiahud, or Chudups John.  He was one of the few Duwamish people who did not move from Seattle to the Port Madison Reservation.  He and his family lived on Portage Bay, part of Seattle's Lake Union, in the 1880s, where the photo at right was taken.  According to the Duwamish Tribe, Chudups John had a cabin and potato patch at the foot of Shelby Street (either West Montlake Park or the Roanoke neighborhood, on either side of Portage Bay), as late as 1900 on land given him by pioneer David Denny (or property he purchased— see Cheshiahud).  Photographer Orion O. Denny recorded Old Tom and Madeline, c. 1904, further noted in the archives of the University of Washington Library as Madeline and Old John, also known as Indian John or Cheshishon, who had a house on Portage Bay in the 1900s, south of what is now the UW campus.  

Chudups John and his family, like Princess Angeline, seem to have been excepted from the law by which Native people had been prohibited from residence in Seattle since the mid-1860s. Their story is typical of the relatively few Natives remaining in Seattle after proscription, the rest having moved or died of diseases.  In 1927, his daughter Jennie (Janey) provided a list of the villages along Lake Washington that is a primary source of current knowledge of the village locations.

Hwehlchtid, known as "Salmon Bay Charlie," of the shill-shohl-AHBSH lived in the village of shill-SHOHL on the southern shore Salmon Bay, and was very loath to leave. (The village near today's Hiram M. Chittenden Locks lends its name to today's Shilshole Bay, immediately northwest of Salmon Bay.) Charlie and his wife Chilohleet'sa (Madelline) remained in their traditional homeland long after others of their Tribe had moved away. In about 1905, long-time Seattle Times photographers Ira Webster and Nelson Stevens photographed Salmon Bay Charlie's house at Shilshole with a canoe anchored offshore.

The Treaty of Point Elliott 

The Treaty of Point Elliott was signed on January 22, 1855, at Muckl-te-oh or Point Elliott, now Mukilteo, Washington, and ratified in spring 1859.  Signatories to the Treaty of Point Elliott included Territorial Governor Isaac Stevens and representatives from the Duwamish, Suquamish, Snoqualmie, Snohomish, Lummi, Skagit, Swinomish, and other tribes.  The Duwamish signatories to the treaty were si'áb Si'ahl (Chief Seattle), si'áb Ts'huahntl, si'áb Now-a-chais, and si'áb Ha-seh-doo-an. Other prominent Native American signers included Snoqualmoo (Snoqualmie) and Snohomish chief Patkanim, identified on the treaty as Pat-ka-nam; Skagit chief Goliah; and Lummi chief Chow-its-hoot.  The treaty guaranteed both fishing rights and reservations.  The treaty established the Port Madison, Tulalip, Swinomish, and Lummi reservations. Reservations for the Duwamish, Skagit, Snohomish, and Snoqualmie are conspicuously absent.

As noted above, Coast Salish did not have permanent political offices or formal political institutions that were understood by Whites. Due to a documented mix of motivations, Territorial Governor Isaac Stevens appointed chiefs of tribes in order to facilitate goals of his administration. The Point Elliott Treaty is further complicated by the style of governor Stevens, and the gulf of misunderstanding between the parties.

The treaty contains provisions that raised concern by an attorney in the employ of the Natives at the treaty negotiations. It also contains the now-famous provision cited by Judge Boldt 118 years later:  

According to Hazard Stevens, son of Isaac Stevens, "The salient features of the policy outlined [by Governor Stevens to his advisers] were as follows:

1. To concentrate the Indians upon a few reservations, and encourage them to cultivate the soil and adopt settled and civilized habits.
2. To pay for their lands not in money, but in annuities of blankets, clothing, and useful articles during a long term of years.
3. To furnish them with schools, teachers, farmers and farming implements, blacksmiths, and carpenter, with shops of those trades.
4. To prohibit wars and disputes among them.
5. To abolish slavery.
6. To stop as far as possible the use of liquor.
7. As the change from savage to civilized habits must necessarily be gradual, they were to retain the right of fishing at their accustomed fishing-places, and of hunting, gathering berries and roots, and pasturing stock on unoccupied land as long as it remained vacant.
8. At some future time, when they should have become fitted for it, the lands of the reservations were to be allotted to them in severalty."
[Italics and underlines added]

These goals were significantly different from the verbal assurances provided during negotiations, and all the Native Nations were oral cultures.

After the treaty 
The United States government did not fulfill its commitments to the Duwamish under the Point Elliott Treaty. The Duwamish did not receive a reservation and, indeed, a proposed reservation was specifically blocked in 1866. Some Duwamish joined other tribes and moved onto reservations. Many moved to the Port Madison Reservation, some to the Tulalip or Muckleshoot reservations. Others refused to move. Some Coastal Salish were passionately unwilling to leave their "usual and accustomed places" (a common 19th century phrase that became treaty terms). The People of the Inside and the People of the Large Lake (the Duwamish) in what is now Seattle were (and are) no exception.

In the mid-1860s the U.S. Superintendent of Indian Affairs proposed a Duwamish Indian Reservation along the White and Green River Valleys.  In 1866, some 152–170 King County settlers petitioned Arthur Denny, the Territorial Delegate to Congress, against a reservation for the Duwamish Tribe on the then-Black River, near what is now Renton and Tukwila.  The first signature was Chas. C. Terry (Charles Terry), followed by Arthur himself and David Denny, H. L. Yesler (Henry Yesler), David "Doc" Maynard and virtually all of the Seattle establishment of the time.  The petition was forwarded to the Bureau of Indian Affairs (BIA).  The BIA withdrew the proposal.

Visible Native presence in the City of Seattle had disappeared by 1910, effected primarily by city proscription (c. 1865) and in part by repeated arson.

Tribal status
The Duwamish Tribe adopted a constitution, bylaws, and further structure in 1925, but they are not recognized as a tribe by the United States federal government. Individually, the Duwamish people continue to be recognized by the BIA as legal Native Americans, but not corporately as a tribe.

Tribal membership criteria vary by tribe.  For the Duwamish, in accordance with Salish tradition, enrollment is by the applicant providing a documented genealogy. Consequently, not all Duwamish today are members of the Duwamish Tribe as complete family records may not have been well kept, if kept at all, which is consistent across many Tribes in North America. According to their own web site, the Tribe has more than 600 enrolled members as of 2018.

The Duwamish were party to land claims against the federal government in the 1930s and 1950s. Following the Boldt Decision (1974, upheld 1979) they sought inclusion per the Treaty of Point Elliott, and in 1977 filed a petition, together with the Snohomish and Steilacoom (Chillacum), for federal recognition.

Recognition of the Duwamish Tribe's requires proving they have "continually maintained an organized tribal structure since their ancestors signed treaties with the United States in the 1850s."  U.S. District Judge George Boldt (1903–1984) found in 1979 that the Tribe had not existed continuously as an organized tribe (within the meaning of federal law) from 1855 to the present, and was therefore ineligible for treaty fishing rights.  A gap in the record from 1915 to 1925 prompted Boldt's decision.

According to Russel Barsh, attorney for the Samish in that Tribe's effort to gain recognition, which succeeded in 1996, "the Samish proved in a hearing that Judge Boldt's decision against these tribes was based on incomplete and erroneous evidence." This would argue for allowing an appeal of the decision.

In the mid-1980s, the BIA concluded that since the Duwamish Indians have no land, they cannot be recognized as a "tribe".

In June 1988, 72 descendants of Washington settlers reversed their ancestors and petitioned the Bureau of Indian Affairs in support of federal recognition of the Duwamish Tribe.  The signers were members of the Pioneer Association of the State of Washington, which maintains Pioneer Hall in Madison Park as a meeting hall and archive of pioneer records.

In the mid-1990s, proposals were made in Congress to extinguish all further efforts by unrecognized tribes to gain recognition. These were defeated. Success or continued failure tends to drift with the national mood and leanings of Congress.  Effectively, recognition turns upon the mood of Congress with respect to honoring treaties with Native Americans. Occasionally tribes succeed, such as with the Boldt Decision in 1974.

The Bureau of Indian Affairs (BIA) denied recognition in 1996.  The Tribe then assembled additional evidence for its active existence through the decade in question.  Evidence was assembled from Catholic church records, news reports, oral histories, and further tracing of bloodlines.  Ken Tollefsen, a retired Seattle Pacific University anthropologist, helped assemble the additional data. This new evidence prompted the Bureau of Indian Affairs to reverse its 1996 decision, and the Tribe briefly won federal recognition in January 2001, in the waning days of the Clinton administration.  However, the ruling was voided in 2002 by the Bush administration, citing procedural errors.

The Tulalips have opposed efforts by local unrecognized tribes, contending that the Tulalip Tribe (a post-Treaty construct) are the heirs of an amalgam of unrecognized tribes. This is also the case where it comes to the Muckleshoots. Such potentially adversarial intentions notwithstanding, the Duwamish Tribe pursued litigation for the purpose of gaining tribal recognition. In March 2013 Federal Judge John C. Coughenour granted summary judgement in Hansen et al vs. Salazar ordering the Department of Interior to reconsider or explain the denial of the Tribe's petition. In July 2015 the BIA responded with a conclusion that the Duwamish do not meet the criteria for federal recognition. In May 2022, the Duwamish sued Department of Interior attempting to gain federal recognition.

Recent history 

Unlike many other Northwest Coast indigenous groups, many Duwamish did not move to reservation lands, yet still retain much of their cultural heritage.  In recent decades notable elders are recovering and younger members are further developing that heritage.

Members of the Duwamish continue to be involved in Seattle's Urban Indian culture, as represented in such institutions as United Indians of All Tribes and the Seattle Indian Health Board.

While there had been few visible signs of traditional Native culture in Seattle since the early 20th century, in March 1970 local Indians burst back into visibility in the most unmistakable way. Bob Satiacum (Puyallup), United Indians founder Bernie Whitebear (Colville Confederated Tribes) and other Native Americans invaded and occupied then-active Fort Lawton, which was originally Indian land, by scaling fences and by scaling the bluffs from the beach. The base had been declared surplus by the Department of Defense.  Under the Treaty of Point Elliott, the United Indians of All Tribes presented a claim to all lands that might be declared surplus.  After worldwide interest, long negotiations and congressional intervention, an eventual result was the construction and a 99-year renewable lease with the City of Seattle for a  site adjacent to the new Discovery Park after the decommissioning of most of the base. The result was Daybreak Star Cultural Center (1977), an urban base for Native Americans in the Seattle area.

Cecile Hansen, great-great-grandniece of Chief Sealth, has been the elected chair of the Duwamish Tribe since 1975, as well as a founder and the current president of Duwamish Tribal Services. In line with the re-asserted Native presence in Seattle, the Tribe established Duwamish Tribal Services in 1983 as a non-profit 501[c]3 organization to provide social and cultural services to the Duwamish Tribal community.  Hansen has also dedicated herself to gaining treaty rights for the Duwamish.

James Rasmussen of the Duwamish Tribe has been a leader since 1980 in efforts to restore the Duwamish River, working with citizen groups and other tribe members.  Accomplishments include gaining federal Superfund Site status for the last  of the river from Turning Basin and Herring House Park to the mouth.  The lower Duwamish was the site of the former concentration of Duwamish villages before substantial European contact.  The most contaminated spots are being dredged and capped, largely c. 2007, overseen by the Port of Seattle and the United States Environmental Protection Agency—and watchdogged.  Complications ensue from the difficulties in tracing those responsible.  Riparian cleanup and habitat restoration continues with citizens groups together with the port.

The new cultural center is built along what is now Marginal Way SW, east of what is now Puget Park, and west of the north tip of what is now called Kellogg Island.

The Duwamish Hill Preserve in Tukwila, Washington is a space of cultural significance, serving as a historical vantage point for seeing people entering or leaving the area; additionally it is the space where the Epic of the Winds is based.

The Renton History Museum (Renton, Washington) has a small exhibit on the archaeological and cultural history of the Duwamish Tribe.

As of late 2022, Indigenous businesses have begun to open in Seattle, including ʔálʔal Cafe, which contexualizes local ingredients and shares traditional dishes.

Names 

In the era since contact with people of European descent, names have changed along with tribal societies.

The present-day name Duwamish is an anglicization of Dxʷ'Dəw?Abš or Dkhʷ'Duw'Absh, "the People of the Inside", or more literally "the People Inside the Bay". This tribal designation also includes the historic "People of the Large Lake" (Xacuabš, Xachua'bsh, hah-choo-AHBSH or hah-chu-AHBSH, People of HAH-choo or Xachu, "People of a Large Lake", "Lake People").

The identical anglicization Duwamish has also come to designate the Duwamish River, which, since its straightening in the early 20th century, has been officially known as the Duwamish Waterway. The People of the Inside called the river, including what is today known as the Cedar River, Dxʷdəw. The names all originate with dəkʷ or dəgʷ from dəw for "inside something relatively small" (in this case Elliott Bay with respect to Puget Sound).

The name Seattle is also of Lushootseed origin. The famous Duwamish leader from whom the city name derives is now best known as Chief Seattle, from si'áb Si'ahl, "high status man Si'ahl". The form Sealth is also used, as in the name of Chief Sealth High School. His gravestone gives his name as a baptized Roman Catholic: Noah Sealth. Another transcription of the name Si'ahl is see-YAHTLH. Lushootseed (Skagit-Nisqually) Coast Salish did not have political chiefs in a European sense, so "chief" is also rather arbitrary. Chief Seattle was prominent in both the Duwamish Tribe and the Suquamish tribes (Suquamish is an anglicization of Dkhʷ'Suqw'Absh; this has no English translation beyond "People of Suq'ʷ."

The name Seattle for the city dates from as early as 1853; the naming is attributed to David Swinson 'Doc' Maynard.

The Duwamish language, Southern Lushootseed, belongs to the Salishan family. The Tribe is Lushootseed (Whulshootseed) (Skagit-Nisqually) Coast Salish. English does not have equivalents for half of the sounds in the language.

Notes and references 
Most of the following notes refer to sources listed in Bibliography for Duwamish (tribe), which also includes the sources referenced in Cheshiahud (Lake John) and History of Seattle before white settlement.

Further reading 

"Coast Salish Villages of Puget Sound".  Particularly useful
"Duwamish Tribe" homepage
"Duwamish history and culture", Duwamish Tribe
"The Lushootseed Peoples of Puget Sound Country", University of Washington Libraries: Digital Collection
"Lushootseed Salish (Whulshootseed, Puget Sound Salish)".  Retrieved April 21, 2006.  Vocabulary, pronunciation, orthography, place names, demography, tribes.
 University of Washington Libraries: Digital Collections:
Jay Miller, "Salmon, the Lifegiving Gift"
David M. Buerge, Native Americans of the Pacific Northwest: An Introduction
Series: Urban Indian Experience, four-part radio series on the Duwamish produced by KUOW for PRX, 2004–2005. Total running time approximately 36 minutes.
 Summary under the Criteria and Evidence for Proposed Finding Against Acknowledgment of the Duwamish Tribal organization, 1996-06-18, United States Department of the Interior.

 
Native American history of Washington (state)
Native American tribes in Washington (state)
Lushootseed language